Jämjö is a locality situated in Karlskrona Municipality, Blekinge County, Sweden with 2,578 inhabitants in 2010.

Sports
The following sports clubs are located in Jämjö:

 Jämjö GoIF

References 

Populated places in Karlskrona Municipality